Total Divas was an American reality television series that premiered on July 28, 2013, on E!. The series gave viewers an inside look at the lives of WWE Divas from their work within WWE to their personal lives. Season 8 ended on November 28, 2018, with 412 thousand viewers.

Production
On May 7, 2018, E! and WWE announced that Total Divas had been renewed for seasons 8 and 9.

In April 2019, Brie and Nikki Bella announced that they would not be returning for the ninth season of Total Divas, saying that they wanted to focus solely on Total Bellas. In August 2019, it was revealed that Naomi, Natalya, and Nia Jax were set to return for season nine alongside Carmella, who was announced to be returning as a series regular, and new cast members Ronda Rousey and Sonya Deville. Additionally, Brie and Nikki Bella were reported to continue making appearances as guests during the season. The ninth season began on October 1, 2019.

In June 2021, Essentially Sports reported that the E! Network had cancelled Total Divas and its sister show Total Bellas, citing low ratings and a lack of interest from those involved.

Cast

Main cast
 Naomi (Trinity Fatu)
 Natalya (Natalie Neidhart-Wilson)
 Carmella (Leah Van Dale)
 Nia Jax (Savelina Fanene)
 Ronda Rousey
 Sonya Deville (Daria Berenato)

Recurring cast
 Brie Bella (Brianna Danielson)
 Nikki Bella (Stephanie Nicole Garcia-Colace)
 Corey Graves (Carmella's boyfriend)
 Travis Browne (Ronda's husband)
 Arianna Johnson (Sonya's girlfriend)
 Charly Caruso (WWE On-Air Personality)
 Liv Morgan (Gionna Jene Daddio)

Guest stars 
 Alexa Bliss (Alexis Kaufman)
 JoJo (Joseann Offerman)
 Mandy Rose (Amanda Rose Saccomanno)
 Paige (Saraya-Jade Bevis)
 Renee Young (Renee Paquette)
 Daniel Bryan (Brie's husband)
 Jimmy Uso (Naomi's husband)
 Tyson Kidd (Natalya's husband)
 Beth Phoenix (Elizabeth Copeland)
 Billie Kay (Jessica McKay)
 Bret Hart (WWE Hall of Famer & Nattie's uncle)
 Ember Moon (Adrienne Reese)
 Jessamyn Duke (NXT Superstar)
 Marina Shafir (NXT Superstar)
 The Miz (Michael Mizanin)
 Peyton Royce (Cassie McIntosh)
 Tamina (Sarona Snuka-Polamalu)
 Ellie Neidhart (Nattie's mother)
 Jenni Neidhart (Nattie's sister)

Episodes

Ratings

References

Total Divas